Grand Ayatollah Moslem Malakouti (5 June 1924 in Sarab, East Azerbaijan – 24 April 2014 in Tehran) was an Iranian Shiite cleric, Marja and third imam Jumu'ah for Tabriz. His son Ali Malakouti is member of the Assembly of Experts.

See also 

 Lists of Maraji
 List of deceased Maraji
 List of members in the First Term of the Council of Experts
List of members in the Second Term of the Council of Experts

References

External links
 Moslem Malakouti Website
 Moslem Malakouti Images in Fars News

People from Sarab, East Azerbaijan
1924 births
2014 deaths
Iranian ayatollahs
Representatives of the Supreme Leader in the Provinces of Iran
Members of the Assembly of Experts
Society of Seminary Teachers of Qom members